Laryngomalacia (literally, "soft larynx") is the most common cause of chronic stridor in infancy, in which the soft, immature cartilage of the upper larynx collapses inward during inhalation, causing airway obstruction.  It can also be seen in older patients, especially those with neuromuscular conditions resulting in weakness of the muscles of the throat. However, the infantile form is much more common. Laryngomalacia is one of the most common laryngeal congenital disease in infancy and public education about the signs and symptoms of the disease is lacking.

Signs and symptoms
In infantile laryngomalacia, the supraglottic larynx (the part above the vocal cords) is tightly curled, with a short band holding the cartilage shield in the front (the epiglottis) tightly to the mobile cartilage in the back of the larynx (the arytenoids).  These bands are known as the aryepiglottic folds.   The shortened aryepiglottic folds cause the epiglottis to be curled on itself.  This is the well known "omega shaped" epiglottis in laryngomalacia.  Another common finding of laryngomalacia involves the posterior or back part of the larynx, where the arytenoid cartilages or the mucosa/tissue over the arytenoid cartilages can collapse into the airway and cause airway obstruction.

Laryngomalacia results in partial airway obstruction, most commonly causing a characteristic high-pitched squeaking noise on inhalation (inspiratory stridor).  Some infants have feeding difficulties related to this problem.  Rarely, children will have significant life-threatening airway obstruction.  The vast majority, however, will only have stridor without other more serious symptoms such as dyspnea (difficulty breathing).

Causes
Although laryngomalacia is not associated with a specific gene, there is evidence that some cases may be inherited.  Relaxation or a lack of muscle tone in the upper airway may be a factor. It is often worse when the infant is on his or her back, because the floppy tissues can fall over the airway opening more easily in this position.

Diagnosis
The physician will ask some questions about the baby's health problems and may recommend a flexible laryngoscopy to further evaluate the infant's condition. Additional testing can be done to confirm the diagnoses including; flexible fiberoptic laryngoscopy, airway fluoroscopy, direct laryngoscopy and bronchoscopy.

Treatment
Time is the only treatment necessary in more than 90% of infant cases. In other cases, surgery may be necessary. Most commonly, this involves cutting the aryepiglottic folds to let the supraglottic airway spring open.  Trimming of the arytenoid cartilages or the mucosa/ tissue over the arytenoid cartilages can also be performed as part of the supraglottoplasty. Supraglottoplasty can be performed bilaterally (on both the left and right sides at the same time), or be staged where only one side is operated on at a time.

Treatment of gastroesophageal reflux disease can also help in the treatment of laryngomalacia, since gastric contents can cause the back part of the larynx to swell and collapse even further into the airway. In some cases, a temporary tracheostomy may be necessary.

Prognosis
Laryngomalacia becomes symptomatic after the first few months of life (2–3 months), and the stridor may get louder over the first year, as the child moves air more vigorously. Most of the cases resolve spontaneously and fewer than 15% of the cases will need surgical intervention. Parents need to be supported and educated about the condition.

Epidemiology
Although this is a congenital lesion, airway sounds typically begin at age 4–6 weeks. Until that age, inspiratory flow rates may not be high enough to generate the sounds. Symptoms typically peak at age 6–8 months and remit by age 2 years.

Late-onset laryngomalacia may be a distinct entity, which can present after age of 2 years.

References

External links 

Congenital disorders of respiratory system